Theophilus Parsons (1797–1882) was Dane Professor of Law at Harvard from 1848 to 1870.

Parsons is remembered chiefly as the author of a series of useful legal treatises and some books in support of Swedenborgian doctrines. He wrote a life of his father, an American jurist, who was also named Theophilus Parsons (1749–1813). It was published in Boston in 1859. He also edited and published the Civil War letters of his daughter, Emily Elizabeth Parsons, a nurse and administrator of Benton Barracks military hospital in St. Louis, Mo.

He graduated from Harvard College in 1815.

Bibliography
 Theophilus Parsons. "Distinguished Lawyers," Albany Law Journal Aug. 20, 1870, pp 126-7 online.
 Theophilus Parsons. A treatise on the law of partnership (1866) online
 Theophilus Parsons. Outlines of the religion and philosophy of Swedenborg (1876)   online
 Theophilus Parsons. A treatise on maritime law (1859)  online

References

Attribution
 

1797 births
1882 deaths
Harvard University faculty
American Swedenborgians
American legal scholars
American biographers
American male non-fiction writers
Harvard College alumni